Tuszów Narodowy  is a village in Mielec County, Subcarpathian Voivodeship, in south-eastern Poland. It is the seat of the gmina (administrative district) called Gmina Tuszów Narodowy.

The village has a population of 920.

It was the birthplace of General Władysław Sikorski.

References

Villages in Mielec County